The 1996–97 season was Sheffield Wednesday F.C.'s 130th season in existence. They competed in the twenty-team Premiership, the top tier of English football, finishing seventh.

Season summary
A four-match winning start to the season saw Sheffield Wednesday top the Premiership and manager David Pleat receive Manager of the Month award for August, but they soon fell out of the title frame and in the end, despite losing just nine games in the league, they finished seventh in the final table - not even enough for UEFA Cup qualification; they could easily have finished higher had they not drawn as many as 15 games (making it 30 points they dropped).
In the close season, Pleat paid a club record £5.7 million for Celtic's Italian forward Paolo Di Canio, giving his squad a much-needed boost to their hopes of challenging for honours.

Final league table

Results summary

Results by round

Results
Sheffield Wednesday's score comes first

Legend

FA Premier League

FA Cup

League Cup

Players

First-team squad
Squad at end of season

Left club during season

Reserve squad

Transfers

In

Out

Transfers in:  £8,800,000
Transfers out:  £250,000
Total spending:  £8,550,000

Notes

References

Sheffield Wednesday F.C. seasons
Sheffield Wednesday